Rüdiger Schmitt (born 1 July 1939) is a German linguist, Iranologist, and educator. He was a professor of Comparative Indo-European Philology and Indo-Iranian Studies at Saarland University in Saarbrücken, Saarland, Germany, from 1979 until 2004.

He studied comparative linguistics of Indo-European, Indo-Iranian, and classical languages in University of Würzburg in 1958. He studied under Manfred Mayrhofer.

Works
Dichtung und Dichtersprache in indogermanischer Zeit (1967)
Bemerkung zu dem sog. Gadatas-Brief (1996)
Onomastica Iranica Platonica (1996)
On Old Persian hypocoristics in -iya- (1997)
Compendium Linguarum Iranicarum (1989)
Beiträge zu Altpersischen Inschriften (1999)
Die iranischen Sprachen in Geschichte und Gegenwart (2000)
Meno-logium Bagistano-Persepolitanum: Studien zu den altpersischen Monatsnamen und ihren elamischen Wiedergaben (2003)

He has written many articles in Encyclopaedia Iranica.

References

External links
Rüdiger Schmitt, Acta Iranica

Living people
Writers from Würzburg
1939 births
Linguists from Germany
Iranologists
linguists of Iranian languages
linguists of Persian